The 2017 Challenger La Manche was a professional tennis tournament played on indoor hard courts. It was the 24th edition of the tournament which is part of the 2017 ATP Challenger Tour. It took place in Cherbourg, France between 13 and 19 February.

Singles main-draw entrants

Seeds

 1 Rankings are as of February 6, 2017.

Other entrants
The following players received wildcards into the singles main draw:
  Geoffrey Blancaneaux
  Maxime Janvier
  Axel Michon
  Alexandre Sidorenko

The following player received entry into the singles main draw as a special exemption:
  Edward Corrie

The following players received entry from the qualifying draw:
  Filip Krajinović
  Daniel Masur
  Corentin Moutet
  Hugo Nys

Champions

Singles

 Mathias Bourgue def.  Maximilian Marterer 6–3, 7–6(7–3).

Doubles

 Roman Jebavý /  Igor Zelenay def.  Dino Marcan /  Tristan-Samuel Weissborn 7–6(7–4), 6–7(4–7), [10–6].

External links
Official Website

Challenger La Manche
Challenger La Manche
2017 in French tennis
February 2017 sports events in France